Make It 16 Incorporated v Attorney-General is a 2022 decision of the Supreme Court of New Zealand. The court found that the provisions in the Electoral Act 1993 and Local Electoral Act 2001 that set the voting age of 18 years was an unjustified limitation on the right to be free from age discrimination in section 19 of the New Zealand Bill of Rights Act 1990 (BORA). 

In response to the judgment, Prime Minister Jacinda Ardern subsequently announced that a bill to lower the voting age to 16 would be debated in the New Zealand Parliament, requiring a supermajority to pass. Polling after the judgment by The New Zealand Herald showed that 79 per cent of respondents did not support lowering the voting age. Stuff reported in December 2022 that 73 mayors and councillors across the country had signed a letter supporting the Make It 16 campaign.

Background

Make It 16 
Make It 16 was formed out of the New Zealand Youth Parliament in September 2019 to campaign for suffrage to be granted to 16- and 17-year-olds. When the youth-led campaign launched, its co-director Gina Dao-McLay said that "politicians were blocking the voices of 16 and 17-year-olds even though they could work fulltime, consent to sex, drive a car and own guns". Andrew Becroft, then Children's Commissioner, expressed his support for the campaign alongside several members of Parliament, notably the Green MP Chlöe Swarbrick.

High Court 
On 24 August 2020, Make It 16 took their campaign to the Wellington High Court, arguing that the voting age of 18 is unjustified age discrimination under the Bill of Rights Act 1990 and urging the court to rule it as inconsistent with the Bill of Rights Act 1990.

On 7 October 2020, Justice Jan-Marie Doogue delivered her judgment and concluded that "the age restriction in the voting age provisions is a justified limit on the right in [section] 19 of BORA to be free from discrimination on the basis of age", highlighting an excerpt from Child Poverty Action Group Inc v Attorney-General of "Parliament's clear intention, in [section] 12 of BORA, to grant those aged 18 and over the right to vote in general elections" and that most countries currently have their voting age set at 18. As a result, she declined the application for a declaration of inconsistency. Attorney-General David Parker publicly stated that his position was that the High Court's judgment to decline the declarations sought was correct and that section 12 of the Bill of Rights Act settled any limitation on the voting age.

Court of Appeal 
Make It 16, disagreeing with Doogue's judgment and saying "there was no good reason why they should be excluded", took their case to the Court of Appeal to appeal her decision. The court heard their appeal on 5 August 2021. On appeal, Make It 16 lawyer Emma Moran argued the Attorney-General had not justified the discrimination and that Doogue was incorrect in not granting declarations of inconsistency.

On 14 December 2021, the Court of Appeal's judgment from Justices Christine French, Forest Miller and Patricia Courtney was given by Justice French. In contrast from the High Court judgment, the Court of Appeal ruled that the "Attorney-General has not established that the limits on the right of 16- and 17-year-olds to be free from age discrimination caused by the voting age provisions are reasonable limits that can be demonstrably justified in a free and democratic society". However, despite ruling that it was unjustified age discrimination, the court chose to exercise restraint and decline the applications for declarations of inconsistency, citing that suffrage being extended to 16-year-olds was an issue "very much in the public arena already" and that it is "an intensely and quintessentially political issue involving the democratic process". 

When speaking to Radio New Zealand, Thomas Pope-Kerr from Make It 16 noted their frustration on not getting the declaration but said that the group was taking the court's ruling as a win and would likely be appealing to the Supreme Court to seek a declaration of inconsistency.

Judgment 
On 13 April 2022, the group's appeal of the Court of Appeal's decision to the Supreme Court was granted leave. Make It 16 co-director Caeden Tipler stated to The New Zealand Herald, "A formal declaration from the Supreme Court would be a powerful message to Parliament that they should fix this breach of our rights". The Court then heard the case on 12 July 2022.

Majority opinion 
On 21 November 2022, Justice Ellen France gave the Supreme Court's judgment on Make It 16's case that the voting age of 18 was unjustified age discrimination. Chief Justice Helen Winkelmann, and Justices Susan Glazebrook, Mark O'Regan and Ellen France ruled in the majority that the provisions of the Electoral Act 1993 and Local Electoral Act 2001 were inconsistent with the right to be free from discrimination on the basis of age and that they had not been justified under section 5 of the Bill of Rights Act. They thus ruled to grant declarations of inconsistency in those provisions. In their ruling, they agreed with the Court of Appeal's assessment that it was unjustified age discrimination and sought to assess whether that court was right not to issue the declarations.

Make It 16 argued that "where there is an inconsistency which has not been justified, there should be a presumption (in civil cases) that a declaration will follow so that there is an effective remedy for rights infringements" and that "[is consistent with] the approach adopted in cases in the Australian Capital Territory to the making of a declaration of incompatibility" under section 32 of the Human Rights Act 2004. The group also observed that the courts in the United Kingdom on making declarations of incompatibility with the European Convention on Human Rights had engaged in "policy-heavy issues".

Conversely, the Attorney-General argued that "the equivalent New Zealand jurisprudence [on declarations of inconsistency] is in its infancy" and that the Court of Appeal's ruling to exercise restraint was correct and that "a declaration would be premature where Parliament has expressly postponed any consideration of the question until there is broad democratic support for the change". From there the Attorney-General further noted with respect to it already being a political issue was that the voting age was already identified as a matter for review in the Independent Panel reviewing electoral law, and that Green MP Golriz Ghahraman's Electoral (Strengthening Democracy) Amendment Bill which, among other things, lowered the voting age to 16, failed its first reading on 21 September 2022.

In its assessment, the Supreme Court considered the arguments given and said that it was "not persuaded it would be premature to make a declaration". It noted that lowering the voting age to 16 was previously mentioned in the Royal Commission on the Electoral System in 1986, which stated that there was "a strong case" that could be made, and recommended Parliament to "keep the voting age under review". 

The court's majority determined that the court should "fulfil [its] role which is to declare the law", concurring with United Kingdom Supreme Court Justice Lady Hale in her opinion in Nicklinson: "we have no jurisdiction to impose anything: that is a matter for Parliament alone. We do have jurisdiction, and in some circumstances an obligation, to form a professional opinion, as judges, as to the content of the Convention rights and the compatibility of the present law with them. Our personal opinions, as human beings, ... do not come into it." As a result of this, the court stated that the "Court of Appeal erred in declining to grant the declaratory relief sought", resulting in the declarations sought being granted.

Dissent 
Justice Stephen Kós dissented from the court's majority stating that he did not consider the voting age of 18 under the Electoral Act 1993 for parliamentary elections to be inconsistent with the Bill of Rights Act as he considered the right to vote in parliamentary elections at 18 years under section 12 of the Bill of Rights Act as prevailing over the right to be free from discrimination on the basis of age under section 19. He refuted the Court of Appeal and current court's opinion which construed that "section 12 as simply protecting 18 year-old voters against an increase in the voting age" is "too narrow of a view". In this, he discussed that the voting age provisions were reserved provisions, and that those reserved provisions do not only "protect against diminution of voter qualification ... They also protected qualified voters against enlargement of voter qualification.", and that constitutionally reserved provisions, affirmed by section 12 of the Bill of Rights Act, should prevail over the generalised right to be free from discrimination under section 19. Furthermore, while noting that in this instance the statutory interpretation canon generalia specialibus non derogant (general provisions do not derogate from specific ones) should not need to be applied in this case, he said that Parliament's silence in amending section 12 in 1993 when passing the Electoral Act 1993 and keeping the voting age entrenched at 18 is "persuasive"; however, Kós also noted that when applying lex specialis, it "propels analysis in the same direction".

However, Kós concurred with the court's majority on local elections. He stated, "A declaration of inconsistency must be made in relation to the provisions of the Local Electoral Act" and explained that his dissenting opinion on the age to vote for parliamentary elections does not apply to local elections, as "those provisions stand alone, unaffected (and unprotected) by section 12 [of the Bill of Rights Act]. They are inconsistent with section 19, and the Attorney-General does not attempt to justify the inconsistency under section 5." Kós ended his opinion noting the importance of public appreciation that what has been made "is a declaration of inconsistency, not illegality", and that "Parliament is the sole arbiter of the content of legislation; the courts are the sole arbiters of legislative interpretation."

Responses
Following the Supreme Court ruling, Prime Minister Jacinda Ardern expressed support for lowering the voting age to 16 years. She announced that the Labour Government would introduce legislation lowering the voting age to 16 years; this law change requires a 75% majority as it is a 'reserved provision' under the Electoral Act 1993. By contrast, National Party justice spokesperson Paul Goldsmith stated that his party would not be supporting lowering the voting age on the grounds that it regarded the current voting age of 18 years as appropriate. Goldsmith described the government's proposed law change as a distraction from youth crime.

On 22 November 2022, Ardern and Deputy Prime Minister Grant Robertson confirmed that the Labour ministers were considering whether to allow 16-year-olds to vote in local body elections. Unlike parliamentary elections, law changes for local body elections would only require a simple majority. In response, ACT leader David Seymour, who had earlier opposed lowering the voting age for parliamentary elections, indicated that he was open to lowering the voting age for local body elections and would allow ACT MPs a conscience vote on the matter.

In December 2022, the Hutt City, Kāpiti Coast District and Porirua City councils voted to endorse the Make It 16 campaign and to extend voting rights for local elections to 16- and 17-year-olds, joining the Wellington City Council who supported the move to lower the voting age in 2021. According to Stuff, "seventy-three elected councillors and mayors from councils across the country have signed a letter in support of Make It 16."

On 13 March 2023, Prime Minister Chris Hipkins scrapped plans for legislation to lower the voting age in general elections, stating his plan to focus on lowering the voting age in local elections instead.

Public opinion on the voting age
In early October 2020, a 1 News Colmar Brunton poll found that 13% of respondents supported lowering the voting age to 16 years while 85% opposed the motion. Segments most supportive of lowering the voting age were Green Party supporters and those in their 30s while segments most opposed to lowering the voting age were those aged over 70 years, National Party supporters, and Aucklanders.

In late October 2022, the Taxpayers' Union and Auckland Ratepayers' Alliance released the results of a Curia Market Research poll of 1,000 eligible voters (over the age of 18), which found 74% of respondents opposed to lowering the voting age and 23% in favour.

On 1 December 2022, The New Zealand Herald released the results of its own exclusive poll which found that 21% of respondents supported lowering the voting age to 16 years, whilst 79% opposed it. Polling reveals that support for lowering the voting age is the highest at 31% in 18–24-year-olds, with support decreasing in older age brackets up to 55–64-year-olds with only 12% supportive.

See also 
 New Zealand Bill of Rights Act 1990
 Voting in New Zealand
 Voting age § Debate on lowering the voting age to 16

References 

Supreme Court of New Zealand cases
2022 in New Zealand law
2022 in case law
Constitutional law
Human rights abuses in New Zealand
Elections in New Zealand